Merryl H. Tisch is the former Chancellor of the New York State Board of Regents and wife of James S. Tisch, an heir to the Loews Corporation. In November 2015, she stepped down from her role after nearly 20 years on the board.

Background
Tisch was born Merryl Hiat to Rabbi Philip Hiat. Meryl's sister, Susan Hiat, was married (since divorced) to James's brother, Andrew Tisch. She received a B.A. from Barnard College, an M.A. from New York University and an Ed.D. from Teachers College, Columbia University. She taught first graders at the Ramaz School in the Upper East Side of Manhattan and at the B’nai Jeshurun School from 1977 to 1984.

Tisch has served in various civic service positions, including at The Washington Institute for Near East Policy, the UJA-Federation of New York, the Leadership Enterprise for a Diverse America, the United States Holocaust Memorial Museum, and the Citizens Budget Commission. Tisch is the chairperson of the Metropolitan Council on Jewish Poverty. Tisch is on the Board of the Dalton School on the Upper East Side and Barnard College.

Controversies
She said that budget restraints left the Board in May 2011 with no choice other than to cancel January Regents tests. At the end of May 2011, principals affiliated with the New Visions for Public Schools signed a letter of complaint directed to Tisch and the Board, arguing that the elimination of the tests would lead to a higher dropout rate and would cost the state money.

She has criticized Pearson PLC, the education text and test publisher, recently questioning its ability to handle its growing workload. “Obviously, the public is starting to question, I think, very aggressively with us whether or not they’re able to manage all of the things they’ve taken on.”

Following a protest rally at Albany by the New York State United Teachers, she acknowledged that New York State would hold off on a plan to raise the percentage by which test scores would count in a teacher's evaluation from 20 percent to 25 percent.  A provision in the state’s evaluation law, passed in 2010, allows for the increase if officials adopt a more complex “value-added” model to measure student growth.

She faced organized opposition when she returned on May 21, 2013 to her alma mater, Teachers College, for an award. Education professor and activist Diane Ravitch dubbed her “the Doyenne of high-stakes testing.

Political involvements
In April 2013, Tisch announced that she would become chairwoman of the campaign of former New York City comptroller Democrat Bill Thompson. Among her activities in the Thompson campaign, she hosted the June 12 Women for Thompson event, at which major attendees were Randi Weingarten, Hazel Dukes and Kauturia D'Amato, wife of former Republican U.S. Senator Alphonse D'Amato. The New York Post criticized her concurrent work in the Board of Regents and her leading role in the Thompson campaign as “moonlighting.”

Tisch's husband James is an active supporter of Joe Lhota, the Republican front-runner in the 2013 New York City mayoral race.

Personal life
Tisch is married to James S. Tisch, the heir to the Loews Corporation. They have three children:

 Jessica Sarah Tisch (born 1981) - earned law and business degrees from Harvard University in three years and is currently the Commissioner of Sanitation for the New York City Department of Sanitation. She previously worked in the counterterrorism bureau of the New York City Police Department, amongst other civilian positions before she was appointed as Deputy Commissioner, Information Technology for the NYPD in 2008, and then was appointed Commissioner for the NYC Department of Information Technology and Telecommunication by Mayor de Blasio in November 2019. In 2006, she married Daniel Zachary Levine in a ceremony officiated by her maternal grandfather, Rabbi Philip Hiat, at the Central Synagogue in Manhattan.
 Benjamin Jacob Tisch (born 1983) - worked for the hedge fund Fortress Investment after attending Brown University and then as a portfolio manager in the investment department of the Loews Corporation. In 2011, he married Daniela Weber in a ceremony officiated by Hiat, at the Central Synagogue in Manhattan.
 Samuel Aaron Tisch (born 1985) works for Citigroup after attending Brown University and in 2013, he married Eliana Bavli in a ceremony presided over by Hiat, at the Park Avenue Armory in Manhattan.

References

20th-century American educators
20th-century American women educators
21st-century American educators
21st-century American women educators
American Jews
Barnard College alumni
educators from New York City
living people
New York University alumni
Teachers College, Columbia University alumni
Merryl Tisch
year of birth missing (living people)